Edward Chaffyn (fl. 1542) was an English politician.

Chaffyn's life remains obscure. He was a Member (MP) of the Parliament of England for Salisbury in 1542.

References

Year of birth missing
Year of death missing
English MPs 1542–1544